Hat 'n' Boots is a roadside attraction and landmark in the Georgetown neighborhood of Seattle, Washington.  Built in 1954 as part of a Western-themed gas station, it is billed as the largest hat and cowboy boots in America.  To preserve this landmark, the City of Seattle moved the Hat 'n' Boots to the new Oxbow Park in December 2003.

Hat 'n' Boots appeared in the films National Lampoon's Vacation (during the opening credits) and Hype!

References

External links

 
Article on Hat 'n' Boots at Preservation Seattle online magazine
Oxbow Park project information

1954 establishments in Washington (state)
Concrete sculptures in Washington (state)
Georgetown, Seattle
Historic gas stations in the United States
Landmarks in Seattle
Novelty buildings in Washington (state)
Outdoor sculptures in Seattle
Relocated buildings and structures in Washington (state)
Roadside attractions in Washington (state)
Transport infrastructure completed in 1954